Paul Robert Cooper (born 7 June 1982 in York, England) is a former motorcycle speedway rider from England.

Career

Cooper is also an accomplished grasstrack, long track and motorcycle racing rider, reaching the World Final of the latter. He is a multi-British Grasstrack Champion in the minor solo classes and was the 2017 and 2019 British Sand Ace Champion.

World Longtrack Championship
Grand-Prix

2003 – One Grand-Prix 0pts (28th)
2009 – Two Grand-Prix 14pts (18th)

European Grasstrack Championship
Final

 2003   La Reole 6pts (14th)
 2007   Folkestone 9pts (12th)
 2012   Eenrum 7pts (11th)
 2013   Bielefeld 4pts (12th)
 2014   St. Macaire 7pts (14th)
 2015   Staphorst 11pts (4th)
 2016   Folkestone 12pts (10th)

References 

1982 births
Living people
British speedway riders
Sheffield Tigers riders
Sportspeople from York
Individual Speedway Long Track World Championship riders